Situácia & Kachny is a reissue of the first two demo albums, Kachny and Situácia, by the Slovak punk rock band Iné Kafe released in 2002.

Track listing

Personnel
 Majo Chromý - guitar, vocals 1-12 (Situácia)
 Marek "Cibi" Cibula - vocals, guitar 14; 16-18; 20 (Kachny)
 Vratko Rohoň - guitar, vocals 15; 19, backing vocals
 Mario "Wayo" Praženec - bass
 Jozef "Dodo" Praženec - drums

References

2002 compilation albums
Iné Kafe albums
Reissue albums